Gobio kubanicus is a species of gudgeon, a small freshwater in the family Cyprinidae. It is found in the Kuban River basin in Russia.

References

 

Gobio
Fish described in 2004
Fish of Russia